Justin Wilson may refer to:
Justin Wilson (chef) (1914–2001), American chef and humorist
Justin P. Wilson (born 1945), comptroller and former deputy governor of Tennessee
Justin Wilson (racing driver) (1978–2015), British Formula One and IndyCar driver
Justin Wilson (politician) (born 1979), American mayor of Alexandria, Virginia, since 2019
Justin Wilson (baseball) (born 1987), MLB pitcher